The 1978–79 Danish 1. division season was the 22nd season of ice hockey in Denmark. Eight teams participated in the league, and Vojens IK won the championship. The Frederikshavn White Hawks were relegated.

Regular season

External links
Season on eliteprospects.com

Dan
1978 in Danish sport
1979 in Danish sport